Coleophora sparsiatomella is a moth of the family Coleophoridae. It is found in Canada, including Ontario.

References

sparsiatomella
Moths of North America
Moths described in 1941